Helliesen is a surname. Notable people with the surname include:

Henrik Laurentius Helliesen (1824–1900), Norwegian civil servant and politician
Kari Helliesen (born 1938), Norwegian politician

Norwegian-language surnames